The following is an episode list of the 1980s CBS cult private detective series, The Equalizer.

Series overview

Episodes

Season 1 (1985–86)

Season 2 (1986–87)

Season 3 (1987–88)

Season 4 (1988–89)

Home releases
At present, the following DVD sets have been released.

References

External links
 
 

Equalizer
Equalizer